Southern Lee High School is one of two high schools in Sanford, North Carolina, and serves grades 9–12. The school mascot is the cavalier and the school's colors are navy and orange.

Notable alumni

 Aaron Mellette, former NFL wide receiver
 Patrick "ACHES" Price, professional Call of Duty player
 Akeem Richmond, professional basketball player

See also
Lee County High School (Sanford, North Carolina)

References

Public high schools in North Carolina
Schools in Lee County, North Carolina